José Luis Acciari (born 29 November 1978) is an Argentine former footballer who played mainly as a defensive midfielder, currently a manager.

He spent the bulk of his professional career in Spain, mainly with Murcia. Over 12 seasons, he amassed Segunda División totals of 337 matches and 19 goals, also representing in the competition Córdoba, Elche and Girona.

Playing career

Argentina
Acciari was born in San Miguel, Buenos Aires. During his career in his country he played mainly in the Primera Nacional, making only six appearances in the Primera División with Estudiantes de La Plata.

Acciari represented Club Atlético San Miguel, Club Atlético Banfield and Club Almagro. With the second side, he appeared in the second round of the promotion playoffs, in a final defeat against Club Atlético Los Andes.

Spain
In January 2002, Acciari moved abroad to Spain, signing with Real Murcia in the country's Segunda División. After a period of adjustment, he became an undisputed starter for the club which promoted at the end of his first full season, with the player contributing 38 games and four goals.

After a marred transfer to Deportivo de La Coruña, Acciari played 3,354 minutes in 2004–05, but was severely injured in the left knee late into the following campaign, effectively ending his Murcia career – he could only appear five times in 2006–07, with his team again promoting to La Liga.

Acciari was then loaned to another side in the second division, Córdoba CF. In June 2008, Murcia released him and he signed with Elche CF of the same tier for two years.

On 11 July 2012, Acciari returned to the Estadio Nueva Condomina after arriving from Girona FC. Over his two spells, he made 267 competitive appearances.

Coaching career
After retiring at the age of 36, Acciari went on to work as manager to Murcia and Elche's reserves. He also acted briefly as interim to the first team of both clubs.

On 18 June 2019, Acciari was appointed at Tercera División's CD Guadalajara. He resigned on 26 August 2020.

Acciari signed with Racing Murcia FC of the same league on 17 May 2021. The following month, he agreed to a contract extension.

Managerial statistics

Honours
Murcia
Segunda División: 2002–03

References

External links

1978 births
Living people
Argentine sportspeople of Italian descent
Sportspeople from Buenos Aires Province
Argentine footballers
Association football midfielders
Argentine Primera División players
Primera Nacional players
Club Atlético Banfield footballers
Estudiantes de La Plata footballers
Club Almagro players
La Liga players
Segunda División players
Segunda División B players
Real Murcia players
Córdoba CF players
Elche CF players
Girona FC players
Argentine expatriate footballers
Expatriate footballers in Spain
Argentine expatriate sportspeople in Spain
Argentine football managers
Segunda División B managers
Tercera División managers
Real Murcia managers
Elche CF Ilicitano managers
Elche CF managers
CD Guadalajara (Spain) managers
Argentine expatriate football managers
Expatriate football managers in Spain